Gerður Helgadóttir (1928–1975) was an Icelandic sculptor and stained glass artist.

She studied at the Art and Craft School of Iceland (MHÍ), in Denmark, at the Accademia di Belle Arti Firenze and at the Académie de la Grande Chaumière, Paris. Perhaps her most noted work was her stained glass in Skálholt Cathedral and the church in Kópavogur.

Honours 
In 1974, she was awarded the Order of the Falcon.

Artworks 
In the 1960s, Gerður produced geometric ironworks which earned her notoriety as a pioneer of three-dimensional abstract artworks in Iceland. Gerður was renowned for her glass works, which decorate six churches in Iceland alone.

In 1973, she created a large mosaic at the Tollhús in Hafnarstræti in Reykjavík which was one of the largest artworks to have been produced in Iceland up until that point.

External links 
 Gerðarsafn (a progressive art museum dedicated to the memory of Gerður Helgadóttir)

Other sources
 Elín Pálmadóttir, (1998) Gerður: ævisaga myndhöggvara önnur útgáfa (Listasafn KópavogsGerðarsafn).
 Gerður Helgadóttir myndhöggvari (1995) (Listasafn Kópavogs – Gerðarsafn).

References 

1928 births
1975 deaths
20th-century Icelandic sculptors
20th-century Icelandic women artists
Stained glass artists and manufacturers
Alumni of the Académie de la Grande Chaumière
Icelandic women sculptors